Pensax is a village and civil parish of northwest Worcestershire in England, incorporating the hamlet of Menithwood to the west of Pensax Common. According to the 2001 census, the parish had a population of 317.

Pensax  borders the parishes of Stockton-on-Teme, Abberley, Rock and Lindridge. It is home to a multiple CAMRA award-winning pub, 'The Bell', which won 'West Midlands Pub of The Year' in 2007. Besides The Bell, Pensax is home to a parish church (dedicated to St. James the Great) built 1832  and a small village hall. A local primary school, Pensax Church of England school, closed in 2003.

History

The name Pensax is a combination of the Celtic words "pen" (hilltop) and "sais" (Englishman, Saxon). Unlike many English place names with Celtic elements, the modifier follows the basic noun, as is customary in Celtic languages. This indicates that Brittonic speakers coined the name, rather than Old English speakers borrowing a Brittonic element.

The close village of Menith Wood also has a Celtic name meaning mountain/hill, this time derived from the Welsh language word "mynydd". Nearby, too, lies the River Teme, whose name comes from the Celtic "tamesis" (the dark one), the same as the rivers Thames and Tame. All of this points to a strong Celtic speaking population having still resided in this area after the Anglo Saxons migrated into the region and took over the local government. 

Following the Poor Law Amendment Act 1834 Pensax Parish ceased to be responsible for maintaining the poor in its parish. This responsibility was transferred to Martley Poor Law Union.

For local government purposes Pensax forms part of the district of Malvern Hills.

References

External links 

photos of Pensax and surrounding area on geograph

Villages in Worcestershire
Civil parishes in Worcestershire